The Montreal Heart Institute Foundation (French: Fondation de l’Institut de Cardiologie de Montréal) is a non-profit group associated to Montreal Heart Institute, in Montreal, Quebec, which aims to raise and administer funds to support the research, teaching, care, and prioritize the innovative cardiovascular research projects.

See also 
 Montreal Heart Institute

References 

Heart disease organizations
Health charities in Canada
Foundations based in Canada